Ahmed Mala Qader or Saeb (سائیب in Kurdish), (1854 – 1910), was a Kurdish poet. Saeb was born in Sulaymaniyah in Iraqi Kurdistan.

References

1854 births
1910 deaths
Kurdish-language poets
Kurdish poets
People from Sulaymaniyah